Matt O'Donnell may refer to:

 Matt O'Donnell (journalist) (born 1972), American television journalist
 Matt O'Donnell (greyhound trainer) (1933–2016), Irish greyhound trainer
 Matt O'Donnell (Canadian football) (born 1989), Canadian football offensive lineman

See also
 Matthew O'Donnell (1932–1996), Irish priest and president of St. Patrick's College, Maynooth